Paolo Gerolamo Piola (1666–1724) was an Italian painter of the Baroque period active mainly in Genoa. His father was the prominent Genoese painter Domenico Piola. Paolo Gerolamo was very active painting sacred subjects and frescoes.

He was sent to study in Rome by his father, where he supposedly studied the work of Caracci, and studied under Carlo Maratta. Returning to Genoa, his father found his style ponderous. He was ultimately praised for his designs, and canvases for the church of Santa Maria di Carignano.

References

1666 births
1724 deaths
17th-century Italian painters
Italian male painters
18th-century Italian painters
Painters from Genoa
Italian Baroque painters
18th-century Italian male artists